TCDD District 1 is one of the seven districts of the Turkish State Railways (TCDD). The headquarters are in Haydarpaşa Terminal in İstanbul.

Except for the Kırklareli Branch and the Pehlivanköy-Uzunköprü line, the entire district is electrified with over head catenary. The district, at a length of  track, operates part of the Istanbul-Ankara Main Line from Haydapaşa to Polatlı, the old CO main line (İstanbul-Uzunköprü), the Edirne Cut-off, the Adapazarı Branch and the abandoned Kırklareli Branch. The district also operates rail service to the ports of Haydarpaşa and the Port of Derince. The district operates lines from İstanbul to other towns and cities such  as: Çerkezköy, Uzunköprü, Edirne, Kapıkule, Gebze, İzmit, Adapazarı, Bilecik, Eskişehir and Polatlı.

Turkish State Railways